Angel Lam On Ki (born 20 April 1992) is an athlete from Hong Kong who specialises in the sprinting events. She is Hong Kong national record holder in the indoor 60,100 metres.

Competition record

Personal bests
Outdoor
100 metres – 11.62 (Hong Kong Record, Doha 2019)
200 metres – 27.23 (−1.8 m/s, Gwangju 2015)
Indoor
60 metres – 7.45 (Doha 2016) NR

References

1992 births
Living people
Hong Kong female sprinters
Athletes (track and field) at the 2010 Asian Games
Athletes (track and field) at the 2014 Asian Games
Athletes (track and field) at the 2018 Asian Games
Asian Games competitors for Hong Kong